The Trilene knot  is a multi purpose fishing knot that can be used for attaching monofilament line to hooks, swivels and lures. It resists slippage and failures. Developed by professional anglers Jimmy Houston and Ricky Green in the late 1970s, the knot evolved out of experimentation during promotional events for Trilene, a fishing line manufacturer. Both men favored the idea of naming the knot after themselves, though Trilene ultimately applied its own name.

References

External links
 Video instructions for tying the Trilene Knot
 Drawings on how to tie a trilene knot

Fishing knots